Ryder System, Inc., commonly known as Ryder, is an American transportation and logistics company. It is especially known for its fleet of commercial rental trucks.

Ryder specializes in fleet management, supply chain management, and transportation management. It also offers full-service leasing, rental and maintenance, used vehicle sales, transportation management, professional drivers, e-commerce fulfillment, and last-mile delivery services. Ryder operates in North America, and the United Kingdom. It has its headquarters in Miami-Dade, Florida.

History 
Ryder was founded in Miami, Florida in 1933 by James Ryder as a concrete hauling company with one truck, a 1931 Model "A" Ford. In 1938, Ryder signed a five-truck lease deal with Champagne Velvet Beer, increasing Ryder's fleet to 20 trucks. By the following year, the fleet grew to more than 50 trucks. This led to Ryder changing its focus from distribution to leasing. Ryder bought Great Southern Trucking Company in 1952. In 1955 Ryder System, Inc. was formed to combine Great Southern and Ryder Truck Rental. Ryder System went public in 1955. By the 1960s and 1970s, Ryder had expanded into the distribution and supply chain markets.

James A. Ryder, founder and chairman, retired in 1978 and died in 1997.

In 2008, Ryder acquired three regional competitors: Pollock NationaLease, Lily Transportation and Gator Leasing.

In December 2011, the non-partisan organization Public Campaign criticized Ryder for spending $0.96 million on lobbying and not paying any taxes during 
2008–2010, instead getting $46 million in tax rebates, despite making a profit of $627 million.

In 2013 Robert E. Sanchez became CEO and Chairman of the company.

In April 2018, Ryder acquired Ohio-based MXD Group, an e-commerce fulfillment and last mile delivery provider with a network of 109 fulfillment centers across the United States and Canada.

In May 2018, Ryder introduced RyderGyde, a commercial fleet management smartphone app for drivers and fleet managers to monitor and manage their fleets. The app allows customers to view the maintenance status of their vehicles, schedule maintenance appointments and compare fuel rates in real-time.

Ryder opened a new logistics center in London, Ontario, Canada in January 2018.

In November 2018 Ryder ordered 1,000 electric trucks to add to their fleet, the largest deal for electric trucks to date in the US.

The company partnered with Fetch robotics to further automate three warehouse locations in Miami, Dallas and Chicago.

The company announced the planned opening of two multi-client facilities in Perris, California and Fort Worth, Texas, while expanding an already existing Ryder warehouse in Douglassville, Pennsylvania. The three facilities were expected to be fully operational by May 2019.

In May 2020 RyderShare was introduced as a collaborative logistics platform.

In May 2020 the company began to expand its e-commerce network with the opening of a new facility in Philadelphia and adding FDA approval for food-grade service to two other facilities in Perris, California and Dallas, Texas.

In response to the COVID-19 pandemic of 2020, Ryder took several steps to work with customers to meet increased demand for warehousing and distribution of essential goods, and to support the flow of goods and services required to fight the pandemic.

In January 2022, Ryder completed the acquisition of Whiplash (formerly Port Logistics Group) for approximately $480 million in cash.

Partnerships for advanced vehicle technologies 
In December 2016 Ryder became the exclusive provider of maintenance and distribution for the hydrogen fuel cell, electric-drive truck of the Nikola Motor Company (NMC). At the end of May 2020 Ryder and Nikola decided to end their service partnership and consider other emerging opportunities in the commercial transportation industry.

As of May 2018 Ryder was working with Tesla Inc. on the development of charging infrastructure for tractors-trailers which were pre-ordered by the company's fleets. The company is also considering the adoption of more electric vehicles when there is more evidence that the company will spend less on truck maintenance. The company is also examining electric engines in driving situations in which gasoline and diesel engines are less efficient.

In 2018 Ryder reserved 500 Chanje Energy medium-duty electric panel vans for commercial truck rental and the ChoideLease fleet.  In November 2018 FedEx announced it was adding 1,000 electric delivery vans to its fleet, buying 100 of them from Chanje Energy Inc, and leasing the additional 900 from Ryder Systems Inc.

In August 2018 Ryder began to use “Uber Central”, a unit of “Uber for Business” to outsource the transportation of customers, drivers, and technicians to and from customer locations.

Ryder is the exclusive maintenance provider for Workhorse's electric fleet in North America. Workhorse introduced the first fleet of all electric cargo vans in the US in the San Francisco Bay area in 2018.

In January 2020 Ryder began a partnership with In-Charge Energy, Inc. and ABB, a provider of industrial automation and technology to provide electric vehicle charging to Ryder's customers.

In June 2020 Ryder began a partnership with Turvo, a provider of collaborative logistics software  to launch a digital platform to connect various pieces of the supply chain.

Leadership
Ryder appointed John Diez to be its new executive VP and chief financial officer in May 2021, taking over from Scott Parker. In August 2019 Ryder named John Diez as president of its fleet business, succeeding Dennis Cooke.

Business  
Ryder divides its business into three segments: Fleet Management Solutions, Supply Chain Solutions, and Dedicated Transportation Solutions. As of December 31, 2019, the total company revenue was $8.93 billion, with profits before income taxes of $42.27 million. The number of full-time employees, as of December 2019 was 39,900 globally, with 38,600 in North America and 1,300 in Europe. The company employs approximately 9,500 drivers, 6,300 technicians and have approximately 25,600 hourly employees in the U.S.  About 4,300 of those are organized by labor unions.

Fleet management 
Ryder's fleet management business is its largest business segment, accounting for 61% of the company's total revenue of $2.3 billion, or $1.4 billion for Q4 of 2019.  This arm of the business does contract-based full-service leasing, contract maintenance, commercial rental and fleet support services. Under full-service leasing Ryder owns and maintains the trucks and the customer decides where they go. In contract maintenance Ryder just takes care of the trucks. Commercial rentals are the white Ryder trucks which the contract customers can rent on a temporary basis. Ryder grew its North American rental fleet to nearly 30,000 vehicles in 2010 and 2011 raising the percentage of model year 2010 or newer vehicles in the fleet to more than 40 percent. Support services consist of insurance, vehicle permits, and fuel. By the end of 2019 the company owned or leased 213,800 vehicles.

In April 2011 Ryder bought B.I.T. Leasing, from Hayward, California. Also in 2011 it acquired the full service leasing and rental business of Carmenita Leasing, Inc., located in Santa Fe Springs, California, and the full service lease, contract maintenance, commercial rental and dedicated contract carriage business, The Scully Companies, Inc., based in Fontana, California.

As of January 2020, Ryder was the largest truck supplier in the US, with a fleet of 2,500 based in Florida alone.

Launched in April 2018, the company operates a peer-to-peer truck-sharing platform, COOP, that allows owners of commercial vehicles to rent unused trucks and trailers to businesses. The program expanded to Florida in January 2019 and further expanded in Texas in February 2020.

As of December 31, 2019, Ryder owned or leased 213,800 vehicles. Ryder sells used trucks, with over 5,000 available for sale.

Supply chain 
Ryder' supply chain operations accounted for 28% of its revenue for a total of $649 million for Q4 2019. This business consists of management of a customer's supply chain. Ryder managed over 50 million square feet (4,645,152 m2)  of warehouse space on December 31, 2019.

In December 2010 Ryder bought TLC, a supply chain services company based in Holland, Michigan.

Dedicated Transportation Solutions 
Ryder Dedicated Transportation Solutions accounted for 15% of its revenue for a total of $346 million for Q4 2019.  This arm of the business conducts both leasing and supply chain management. In 2013, Ryder launched a new name and identity for this program called Ryder Dedicated. The company expanded its Last Mile Delivery service for bulky and large goods to 11 markets in North America. In February 2019 Ryder launched a program for e-commerce that allows manufacturers to ship directly to consumers instead of using third-party shipping for small to large products. In May 2020 the company added food-grade capabilities to its e-commerce service.

Rental trucks 
Ryder launched a consumer truck-rental operation in 1968 with 1,000 trucks and vans.  These were the yellow trucks known as "one-ways" and available for the public to rent from filling stations and other automotive-service locations.  In 1996, Ryder decided to focus on commercial truck rental and leasing, and exited the "one-way" business arena; which it was purchased by equity firm Questor Partners Fund LP, who later sold it to Budget Truck Rental in June 1998.

In 2017 Ryder launched electric truck rentals in California, and Chicago, Illinois. The trucks were equipped with 70kWh batteries, which had an estimated range of 100 miles, just under the smallest battery in a Tesla S model.

Headquarters 
Ryder's headquarters are located in an unincorporated area in northwest Miami-Dade County, Florida, near the Miami Dade-County, Broward County boundary line.

Previously Ryder had its headquarters in Doral, Florida. In 2002, after taking a year-long study of 22 potential headquarters sites in South Florida, Ryder announced that it would move its headquarters to another location in northwest Miami-Dade County. As a result of the move, the commute times of around 200 employees who resided in Broward County decreased. Before the announcement of the final headquarters site, Ryder considered some locations in Miramar in Broward County. In 2005 Shoma Development Corp. began demolishing the former Ryder headquarters in Doral, replacing it with the Park Square at Doral development.

Ryder also has a Shared Services Center in Alpharetta, GA that employs over 500 people and provides support to all FMS operations.

Locations 
Headquartered in Miami, as of December 31, 2019, Ryder had 524 locations in 50 US States and Puerto Rico.

Corporate giving 
The Ryder Charitable Foundation was established in 1984. Since that time it has supported several charitable organizations, including:

 Women in Trucking
 Truckers Against Trafficking
 United Way
 Goodwill of South Florida
 Hiring Our Heroes
 Big Brothers Big Sisters
 Jackson health Foundation
 American Red Cross

Awards and recognition 
 Newsweek World's Most Responsible Companies 2020
 FORTUNE World's Most Admired Companies 2018 and 2019
 FORTUNE 500 2019 and 2020
 Military Friendly Employer 2020
 Top Company for Women to Work for in Transportation 2019
 America's Outstanding Navy Reserve Employers 2019

References

Further reading
 Saunders, Harris. Top Up or Down? The Origin and Development of the Automobile and Truck Renting and Leasing Industry—56 Years, 1916–1972. Birmingham, AL: Harris Saunders, 1972.

External links 

 

Truck rental
Companies based in Miami-Dade County, Florida
American companies established in 1933
Transport companies established in 1933
Companies listed on the New York Stock Exchange
Companies in the Dow Jones Transportation Average
Trucking companies of the United States
Logistics companies of the United States
1933 establishments in Florida
Transportation companies based in Florida